is a Japanese footballer currently playing as a midfielder for Ehime.

Club career
Nakagawa made his professional debut on 14 October 2015 in an Emperor's Cup game against Ventforet Kofu.

Career statistics

Club
.

Notes

References

External links

1997 births
Living people
Japanese footballers
Association football midfielders
Biwako Seikei Sport College alumni
J2 League players
Ehime FC players